Tanaecia amisa is a species of butterfly of the family Nymphalidae.

Description
The upperside of both wings is dark velvety brown, crossed in the middle by a pure white band. The underwings show a pale brown band, edged in both sides with dark brown markings.

Distribution
This species can be found in Borneo.

References

Tanaecia
Butterflies of Borneo
Butterflies described in 1889
Taxa named by Henley Grose-Smith